Energy in Gabon comes from two main sources, fossil-fuels and hydroelectricity. Gabon also relies heavily on oil for its export revenues, exporting both crude oil and petroleum. In terms its oil reserves, the country is one of the richest in sub-Sharan Africa, ranking 5th after Nigeria, Angola, Sudan, South Sudan, and Uganda. Renewable energy in the form of solar power is virtually nonexistent.

Gabon is among Africa’s biggest crude oil producers. However, the country aims to diversify its economy by further developing its agriculture, fisheries, technology, and ecotourism sectors.

Gabon’s total electricity production in 2015 was 199 kilotonne of oil equivalent (ktoe), with 51.7% produced from hydropower sources and 48.2% from fossil fuels. The country’s final consumption of electricity was 169 ktoe.

As of 2014, 15% of rural areas had electricity. The country aims to provide electricity to 85% of rural areas by 2025 and universal access to electricity by 2035.

Oil
Gabon, a former OPEC member (1975–1994) that rejoined in 2016, is the sixth-largest oil producer in sub-Saharan Africa.

The first national oil company was the Société Nationale Petrolière Gabonaise but it was disbanded in 1987.  The government of Gabon controls all petroleum and mineral rights within the state. In 2011 a presidential decree created the Gabon Oil Company (GOC). This new entity works in partnership with international companies operating in Gabon and operates two fields: Obangue and Remboue.

Hydropower

Hydropower accounts for 11% of Gabon's electric power consumption in 2013.

References